Phạm Thị Mai Phương (born 1985) was crowned the eighth Miss Vietnam in 2002. She was the first Miss Vietnam to enter the Miss World competition in 2002, where she placed in the top 20.  In 2003, she was accepted into the University of Luton where she studied business. She was married in Vietnam in 2007.

Miss Vietnam 2002
The winner: Phạm Thị Mai Phương (Hải Phòng)
1st runner-up : Bùi Thị Hoàng Oanh (Saigon)
2nd runner-up : Nguyễn Thị Mai Hương (Hải Dương)
Finalists: Lê Thị Thanh Mai (Saigon), Nguyễn Thanh Xuân (Hà Nội)
Semifinalists: Bùi Thị Hương Giang (Cần Thơ), Đinh Hồng Hạnh (Hà Nội), Trần Ngọc Thuý Hà (Tiền Giang), Đặng Thị Hồng Thiết (Thái Nguyên), Nguyễn Hồng Hạnh (Saigon)

Miss World 2002
Pham Thi Mai Phuong completed Miss World 2002 in Alexandra Palace, London, UK. She entered the top 20 semi-finalist. Miss Turkey-Azra Akın won the crown.

References

External links
 Miss Vietnam official website
 Phạm Thị Mai Phương

Living people
People from Haiphong
1985 births
Miss Vietnam winners
Miss World 2002 delegates